Jouki Aino Terhikki Tikkanen (born 5 July 1995) is a Finnish individual rhythmic gymnast.

Career
Tikkanen started gymnastics in 1999. She is coached by Titta Heikkilä and became a member of the Finnish national gymnastics team in 2010.

2010 
In 2010 Tikkanen competed as a junior. She took silver in the Finnish Junior Championships and was selected to junior national team. She represented Finland in the Junior European Championships, helping the team with ball routine, in which she finished 14th. In Marbella Junior Grand Prix she finished 6th.

2011 
Tikkanen began competing as senior in 2011 season. She won silver in all-around at the Finnish national championships and was the champion in three apparatus final (hoop, ball, clubs). Her first major competition was at the 2011 European Championships. She competed in her first Worlds at the 2011 World Championships where she finished 55th in all-around qualifications.

2012 
In 2012 Tikkanen won her first national champion title in all-around. She took gold also in ball and clubs finals. In fall she competed in Grand Prix series advancing finals in Berlin (6th in clubs and ribbon EF) and in Brno (4th in ball EF and 8th in ribbon EF).

2013 
At the 2013 Finnish championships, she took her second gold in the all-around ahed of Ekaterina Volkova and competed at the 2013 World Championships in Kyiv finishing 28th. Along with Volkova, she represented Finland at the 2013 European Championships, finishing 10th in the team standings and they secured Finland in group A to 2015 ECh. She finished 6th in clubs EF in 2013 Valentine Cup in Tartu.

2014 
Tikkanen was the 2014 Finnish national all-around champion for third time in a row. She competed at the 2014 World Championships in Izmir, Turkey where she qualified for the all-around finals finishing in 17th position ahead of Ukrainian gymnast Viktoria Mazur. That is the best international achievement for Finnish rhythmic gymnast. She had her highest World Cup placement finishing 14th in all-around and 11th in ribbon at the Corbeil-Essonnes World Cup.

2015 
In 2015 Tikkanen finished second in Finnish Championship all-around competition. She was in the first place until the last rotation, where she got a knot in her ribbon. Tikkanen competed at the 2015 World Championships in Stuttgart finishing 35th in the All-around qualifications and did not advance into the Top 24 finals. Tikkanen competed in 2015 European Championships in Minsk, Belarus and finished 21st in all-around and 6th in team final with teammate Ekaterina Volkova.

2016 
In 2016 Season, Tikkanen competed at the 2016 Espoo World Cup finishing 19th in the all-around. Tikkanen then finished 8th in the all-around at the 2016 Grand Prix Bucharest with a total of 67.450 points. On April 21–22, Tikkanen  and compatriot Jekaterina Volkova vied for a single Olympics berth in individual rhythmic gymnastics however; Tikkanen was edged out by Volkova by finishing fourth amongst a top 8 selection of highest score for non qualified gymnasts at the 2016 Gymnastics Olympic Test Event held in Rio de Janeiro.

On June 3–5, Tikkanen finished 17th in the all-around at the 2016 Guadalajara World Cup. Tikkanen then qualified for the 2016 European Championships in Holon, Israel where she finished in 17th place. In Finnish Championships she was second after Jekaterina Volkova and took gold in clubs EF.

2017 
On March 24–26, Tikkanen competed at the Thiais Grand Prix finishing 18th in the all-around. On April 7–9, Tikkenen competed at the 2017 Pesaro World Cup finishing 34th in the all-around. On May 19–21, Tikkanen represented as individual senior for Finaland at the 2017 European Championships. Her next event was at the 2017 World Challenge Cup Guadalajara where she finished 21st in the all-around. On June 23–25, Tikkanen competed at the 2017 Grand Prix Holon finishing 13th in the all-around. On August 5–7, Tikkanen finished 19th in the all-around at the 2017 Minsk World Challenge Cup. On August 11–13, Tikkanen then competed at the 2017 Kazan World Challenge Cup finishing 20th in the all-around. On August 30 - September 3, Tikkanen competed at the 2017 World Championships in Pesaro, Italy; finishing 43rd in the all-around qualifications and thus not making the top 24 all-around finalists.

2018 
Tikkanen started the season competing at the 2018 Moscow Grand Prix finishing 18th in the all-around and qualified into two finals (ball and ribbon). She finished 7th in the ball final and 4th in the ribbon final after Bulgarian Boryana Kaleyn. She competed at the 2018 Sofia World Cup finishing 18 in the all-around. On April 13–15, Tikkanen then competed at the 2018 Pesaro World Cup finishing 29th in the all-around. On May 11–13, Tikkanen achieved a new high placement finishing 8th in the all-around at the 2018 Portimao World Challenge Cup, she also qualified into her first apparatus finals (clubs and ribbon) in a world cup. She finished 4th in the Clubs final and 8th in the ribbon final.

Personal life 
Tikkanen graduated from Sports Highschool Mäkelänrinne in June 2015. She was named as Sports Captain in the graduation celebration. Now she is a professional athlete.

Routine music information

References

External links
 
 

1995 births
Living people
Finnish rhythmic gymnasts
Sportspeople from Vantaa